Ponts et Chaussées (Bridges and Roads) may refer to:

 Conseil général des ponts et chaussées, organization of  inspectors general of bridges and roads in France
 Corps des Ponts et Chaussées, organization of civil engineers in France
 École Nationale des Ponts et Chaussées, school of civil engineers in France
 Ingénieur des ponts et chaussées, a civil engineer in France